Memory Emotion is the second full-length studio album by synth-pop band Electric Youth. The album was released on Watts Arcade Inc. and Last Gang Records on August 9, 2019. While initially met with mixed reviews from critics, it went on to garner an Electronic Album of the Year nomination at the 2020 Juno Awards, a first for the group.

Track listing

References

2019 albums
Electric Youth albums